In enzymology, a (+)-trans-carveol dehydrogenase is an enzyme that catalyzes the chemical reaction

(+)-trans-carveol + NAD  (+)-(S)-carvone + NADH + H

Thus, the two substrates of this enzyme are (+)-trans-carveol and NAD, whereas its 3 products are (+)-(S)-carvone, NADH, and H.

This enzyme belongs to the family of oxidoreductases, specifically those acting on the CH-OH group of donor with NAD or NADP as acceptor. The systematic name of this enzyme class is (+)-trans-carveol:NAD oxidoreductase. This enzyme is also called carveol dehydrogenase. This enzyme participates in monoterpenoid biosynthesis and the degradation of the terpenes limonene and pinene.

References

 

EC 1.1.1
NADH-dependent enzymes
Enzymes of unknown structure